Leslie Gordon Fagen is an American litigator. He is a senior partner at the international law firm of Paul, Weiss, Rifkind, Wharton & Garrison LLP.

Biography

Fagen was born in Brooklyn, New York. He earned his B.A. from Yale College in 1971, where he was a sabre fencer and captain of the varsity fencing team. He went on to receive a J.D. from Columbia School of Law in 1974. He clerked for Judge Jack B. Weinstein in the United States District Court for the Eastern District of New York. Fagen was a Paul, Weiss partner from 1982 to 2018.

Career

Fagen is a senior partner in the Litigation Department of the international law firm of Paul, Weiss, Rifkind, Wharton & Garrison LLP. He has litigated on behalf of both plaintiffs and defendants for more than 35 years, handling his clients' most complex civil litigation matters.

Fagen is recognized for his broad experience in general commercial litigation across an array of legal disciplines, including antitrust, securities, intellectual property, product liability, real estate, trusts and estates, and insurance issues. He is noted as a leading attorney in Commercial Litigation by Chambers USA, Chambers Global, The International Who's Who of Business Lawyers and Lawdragon 500.

Fagen is a Fellow of the American College of Trial Lawyers.

His work was profiled in an American Lawyer cover story, "The Lifesavers," in which Paul Weiss was selected as the best litigation firm in the United States. He has served as co-chair of the firm's Litigation Department and as a member of the Management Committee, and serves as Chairman of the
Partnership Committee.

He is an adjunct lecturer in law at Columbia Law School, and an adjunct professor of law at Brooklyn Law School.

Fagen is a director of the Lawyers' Committee for Civil Rights Under Law. He has served as president and Vice Chairman of The Educational Alliance, Inc., a multi-disciplinary social service agency, and as a member of the Board of Trustees of Maimonides Medical Center.

He has been a David Rockefeller Fellow (2009–2010) at the Partnership for New York City.

Fagen is the author of numerous publications on intellectual property, product liability and arbitration. He is also the author of a monograph on the life of Paul, Weiss's late patriarch Judge Simon H. Rifkind, published in The Yale Biographical Dictionary of American Law and the editor of At 90. On the 90's.

References

Columbia Law School alumni
Yale College alumni
Year of birth missing (living people)
Living people
American lawyers
Paul, Weiss, Rifkind, Wharton & Garrison people
Brooklyn Law School faculty